Tom Lukiwski (born October 5, 1951) is a former Canadian politician who served as a Member of Parliament (MP) from 2008 to 2021 as a member of the Conservative Party. He represented the Saskatchewan riding of Regina—Lumsden—Lake Centre from 2004 to 2015 and, following the 2012 federal electoral district redistribution, he represented Moose Jaw—Lake Centre—Lanigan from 2015 to 2021. He did not run for re-election in the 2021 federal election.

Background
Lukiwski was born in Esterhazy, Saskatchewan. Prior to entering politics, he was a businessman and political administrator.

Political career
Lukiwski was first elected in 2004, winning by 122 votes over Liberal Gary J. Anderson. His predecessor, Larry Spencer, was denied the opportunity to run as a Conservative, despite having served as a member of the Canadian Alliance, due to inflammatory comments he made regarding homosexuality. At the time, Lukiwski criticized Spencer for making the remarks and approved of revoking Spencer's party membership.

Lukiwski was re-elected in the 2006, 2008, and 2011 general elections.  He served as the Parliamentary Secretary to the Leader of the Government in the House of Commons, the Hon. Peter Van Loan.

Filibustering

Lukiwski is well known on Parliament Hill for his ability to stall Parliamentary Committee business by "filibustering".  An example of this ability includes speaking for almost 120 minutes to prevent the Canadian House of Commons Standing Committee on Environment and Sustainable Development from studying a private member's bill to implement the Kyoto Accord on October 26, 2006.  Lukiwski admitted later that he deliberately stalled the proceedings.  Further examples include the February 5, 2008 and February 7, 2008 Canadian House of Commons Standing Committee on Procedure and House Affairs meetings, in which Lukiwski blocked any inquiry into allegations that the Conservative Party spent over the maximum allowable campaign limits during the 2006 election.

Equalization

As an Opposition MP, Lukiwski argued that non-renewable natural resource revenues, such as revenues from oil and gas, should be excluded from the calculations of the equalization formula.  Despite acknowledging that Saskatchewan was no longer a "have-not" province, Lukiwski estimated that Saskatchewan would be between $800 million to $1.5 billion wealthier each year if non-renewable resources were removed from the equalization formula.

On March 22, 2005, Lukiwski introduced a motion into the House of Commons calling for changes to the equalization formula.  During his speech introducing the motion, Lukiwski stated that "[w]hat we are asking today in this motion is that the non-renewable natural resources should be removed from the equalization formula."

Lukiwski, along with the Conservatives, promised during the 2006 federal election that a Conservative government would remove non-renewable natural resource revenue from the equalization formula.  On January 19, 2006, only days before the 2006 election, Lukiwski stated that Saskatchewan would be "$2 to 2.5 billion wealthier each and every year" as a result of the changes.

However, once elected, the Conservatives began to indicate that any future equalization program changes would not necessarily be what was promised.

In the federal budget introduced on March 19, 2007, the Conservatives introduced changes to the equalization system which imposed caps on payments.  This resulted in Saskatchewan not being able to retain 100% of its non-renewable resource revenue.
Lukiwski acknowledged that the Conservative changes did not exactly fulfill the Conservative's promise with the changes, stating "If you want to say we didn't fulfil the commitment or keep our promise, fair enough."

The 2007 federal budget passed with the support of the Bloc Québécois.

Videotape controversy

On April 3, 2008, the New Democratic Party of Saskatchewan released a videotape showing Lukiwski, then 40 years old, making homophobic remarks in 1991.  At the time the videotape was made, Lukiwski was the general manager of the Progressive Conservative Party of Saskatchewan led by Grant Devine.  In the video, he says:

"There's A's and there's B's. The A's are guys like me, the B's are homosexual faggots with dirt under their fingernails that transmit diseases."

The release of the tape provoked immediate controversy, including calls for Lukiwski's resignation or removal as a Parliamentary Secretary.

Lukiwski apologized for the comments, saying "If I could take those comments back I would... They do not reflect the type of person that I am."

Lukiwski subsequently promised that "I can assure you, Mr. Speaker, and all of my colleagues in this House that I will spend the rest of my career and my life trying to make up for those shameful comments."

However, he failed to attend a May 31, 2008, Regina gay pride parade to which he was invited. Gay groups said they were disappointed that Lukiwski failed to respond at all to the invitation. "Mr. Lukiwski stated in his public apology... that he would spend the rest of his life making amends," said gay pride spokesman Nathan Markwart. "Well, when exactly does that kick in? It is clear that his apology is less than sincere and is, in fact, hollow as it has not been followed up with any concerted effort to join our celebrations as an elected official who represents gays and lesbians in Regina and surrounding area." Markwart noted that the disappointment was heightened by their understanding that Lukiwski was in the Regina area on the date of the parade.

Videotape controversy 2 
During his victory speech on October 19, 2015, Mickey Djuric, then with the Moose Jaw Times-Herald, asserted that Lukiwski called the NDP candidate in the upcoming Saskatchewan elections a "whore". Lukiwski denied the claim, insisting that he referred to "an NDP horde" in his speech. The Times-Herald eventually decided not to run the story, causing Djuric to resign her position in protest, while interim Conservative leader Rona Ambrose stated she was satisfied with Lukiwski's explanation.

Other apologies

In 2005, Lukiwski was sued for libel by former Liberal MP Reg Alcock for wrongly claiming Alcock had given his campaign manager a job with the Canadian Wheat Board.  Lukiwski stated that the matter was settled out of court in 2007 in Alcock's favour, with Lukiwski apologizing to Alcock in a statement.

In November 2009, Lukiwski apologized in the House of Commons for mailing out Parliamentary flyers to the riding of Liberal MP Larry Bagnell which wrongly stated how Bagnell had voted on a private member's bill on the long-gun registry.

Electoral record

References

External links
 Official site
 
 How'd They Vote?: Tom Lukiwski's voting history and quotes
 Tom Lukiwski interview on Beyond Politics (CPAC - July 27, 2009)

1951 births
Living people
Canadian people of Polish descent
Conservative Party of Canada MPs
Members of the House of Commons of Canada from Saskatchewan
Politicians from Regina, Saskatchewan
21st-century Canadian politicians